The 2008 Sri Lanka Vavuniya bombing was a bombing on a police station that killed 12 members of police and injured 40 including children in the town of Vavuniya, Northern Province, Sri Lanka on June 16, 2008. The bombing was carried out by detonating a motorcycle laden with explosives, although the perpetrator has not been confirmed, the Tamil Tigers is believed to be responsible.

See also
 List of terrorist incidents, 2008

References

External links
BBC News

Explosions in 2008
2008 crimes in Sri Lanka
June 2008 events in Asia
Attacks on civilians attributed to the Liberation Tigers of Tamil Eelam
Attacks on police stations in the 2000s
Massacres in Sri Lanka
Liberation Tigers of Tamil Eelam attacks in Eelam War IV
Mass murder in 2008
Terrorist incidents in Sri Lanka in 2008
Building bombings in Sri Lanka